is a village located in Aki District, Kōchi Prefecture, Japan.

Geography 
Geisei is located in southeastern Kōchi Prefecture on the island of Shikoku. It is facing the Pacific Ocean to the south and mountains in the north.

Neighbouring municipalities 
Kōchi Prefecture
 Aki
Kōnan

Climate
Geisei has a humid subtropical climate (Köppen climate classification Cfa) with hot summers and cool winters. Precipitation is high, but there is a pronounced difference between the wetter summers and drier winters.

Demographics
Per Japanese census data, the population of Geisei has decreased steadily since the 1960s.

History 
As with all of Kōchi Prefecture, the area of Geisei was part of ancient Tosa Province. The name of Aki District appears in Nara period records. During the Edo period, the area was part of the holdings of Tosa Domain ruled by the Yamauchi clan from their seat at Kōchi Castle. The villages of Wajiki (和食村), Umanoue (馬ノ上村) and Nishibun (西分村) were established with the creation of the modern municipalities system on October 1, 1889. The three villages merged on July 20, 1954 to form the village of Geisei.

Government
Geisei has a mayor-council form of government with a directly elected mayor and a unicameral village council of five members. Geisei, together with the other municipalities of Aki District, contributes one member to the Kōchi Prefectural Assembly. In terms of national politics, the village is part of Kōchi 1st district of the lower house of the Diet of Japan. Geisei's first mayor, Masao Okamura, served from 1946 as mayor of Nishibun to his retirement in 1996 for 50 years in the same post. He had been reelected 13 consecutive times, ten of which elections were unopposed.

Economy
The local economy is centered on horticulture and greenhouse farming, with commercial fishing and forestry playing a smaller roles.

Education
Geisei has one public elementary school and one public middle schools operated by the village government. The village does not have a high school.

Transportation

Railway
Tosa Kuroshio Railway - Asa Line
 -

Highways

References

External links

 

Villages in Kōchi Prefecture
Populated coastal places in Japan